Reginald Bernard "Reggie" Williams (born May 5, 1966) is a former Major League Baseball outfielder. He played Junior College baseball at USC Salkehatchie in Allendale, South Carolina, prior to attending USC Aiken. On April 18, 2010 he was inducted into the USC Salkehatchie Athletic Hall of Fame.

Career
Reggie Williams played for the USC Aiken Pacers for the 1987 and 1988 seasons. Drafted by the San Francisco Giants in the 25th round of the 1988 MLB amateur draft, Williams made his Major League Baseball debut with the California Angels on September 8, 1992. He appeared in his final game on July 25, 1999.

Williams currently resides in Tampa, Florida. He coaches competitive travel baseball teams from ages 10–18 called The Dawg Pound. His baseball facility is called Dream Makers. All of the coaches that are in the program have coached or played Major League Baseball.

On March 3, 2022, Williams was hired as the manager for the Brockton Rox of the FCBL.

References

External links
, or Retrosheet, or Mexican League, or The Baseball Gauge, or Venezuela Winter League

1966 births
Living people
African-American baseball players
Albuquerque Dukes players
American expatriate baseball players in Canada
American expatriate baseball players in Mexico
Anaheim Angels players
Baseball players from South Carolina
Boise Hawks players
Bridgeport Bluefish players
California Angels players
Clinton Giants players
Edmonton Trappers players
Everett Giants players
Leones del Caracas players
American expatriate baseball players in Venezuela
Los Angeles Dodgers players
Major League Baseball left fielders
Major League Baseball outfielders
Midland Angels players
Newark Bears players
Olmecas de Tabasco players
Palm Springs Angels players
People from Laurens, South Carolina
Quad Cities Angels players
USC Aiken Pacers baseball players
Sultanes de Monterrey players
Vancouver Canadians players
21st-century African-American people
20th-century African-American sportspeople